The 1977 Copa Libertadores Finals was the final two-legged tie to determine the 1977 Copa Libertadores champion. It was contested by Argentine club Boca Juniors and Brazilian club Cruzeiro. The first leg of the tie was played on 6 September at Boca Juniors' home field, La Bombonera, while the second leg was played on 11 September at Cruzeiro's venue, Estadio Mineirão. It was Boca Juniors and Cruzeiro 2nd Copa Libertadores finals.

Boca Juniors won the series after winning the penalty shootout of a tie-breaking playoff 5–4 at Montevideo's Estadio Centenario, therefore winning their first Copa Libertadores after the final lost in 1963 v. Santos.

Qualified teams

Rules
The finals were played over two legs; home and away. The team that accumulated the most points —two for a win, one for a draw, zero for a loss— after the two legs would be crowned the champion. If the two teams tied on points after the second leg, a playoff in a neutral venue would become the next tie-breaker.

Stadiums

Road to the final

Note: In all results below, the score of the finalist is given first (H: home; A: away).

Match details

First leg

Second leg

Playoff

Notes

Once the playoff extra time finished, Venezuelan referee Vicente Llobregat did not allow Boca Juniors coaching staff to enter the pitch to talk with the men chosen to kick the penalties. Therefore manager Juan Carlos Lorenzo took pen and paper to write the names of players designed to kick, they were Pernía, Tesare, Zanabria, Felman and Mouzo. On the bottom, he wrote the word "abajo" (down) to indicate them where to shoot.

Because of coaching staffs were not allowed to enter the field, one of the ball boys gave the paper to captain Rubén Suñé, then the players ordering themselves to kick the penalties.

References

1977 in South American football
1977
l
l
Copa
Copa
1977